Suczki  is a village in the administrative district of Gmina Węgorzewo, within Węgorzewo County, Warmian-Masurian Voivodeship, in north-eastern Poland. It is located in Masuria.

The village was founded by Polish people.

References

Villages in Węgorzewo County